Events from the year 1867 in Denmark.

Incumbents
 Monarch – Christian IX
 Prime minister – C. E. Frijs

Events

 16 January  Emil Messershcmidt's Tannery on Gammel Kongevej in Copenhagen is hit by fire.
 22 May – Maria Fedeorowna arrives to Copenhagen.
 29 October  A hurricane hits the Danish West Indies.

Undated

Births
 10 January  Sophy A. Christensen, furnituremaker (died 1955)
 11 June – Marie Krøyer, painter (died 1940)
 16 September  Hedevig Quiding, singer and music critic (died 1936)
 27 December – Johannes Larsen, painter (died 1961)

Deaths
 3 March – Johan Ludwig Lund, painter (born 1777)
 10 September  Broder Knud Brodersen Wigelsen, naval officer (born 1787)

References

 
Denmark
1860s in Denmark
Years of the 19th century in Denmark